Kristýna Plíšková (born 21 March 1992) is a Czech former professional tennis player. In her career, she won one singles and four doubles titles on the WTA Tour, as well as nine singles and eight doubles titles on the ITF Circuit. On 31 July 2017, she reached her career-high singles ranking of world No. 35. On 14 June 2021, she peaked at No. 44 in the doubles rankings. Plíšková won the 2010 Wimbledon Championships junior tournament, beating Sachie Ishizu in straight sets. She currently holds the record for the most aces (31) in a match on the WTA Tour, which she set in a second-round match against Monica Puig at the 2016 Australian Open.

Personal life
Plíšková was born to Radek Plíšek and Martina Plíšková in Louny, and has an identical twin sister, Karolína, who is also a tennis player, and a former world No. 1. On 6 December 2021, Plíšková posted on her Instagram that she was excited to be expecting a baby with footballer Dávid Hancko., on May 31, 2022 they announced on their social accounts the birth of their son, who was named Adam.

Junior career
Plíšková began competing professionally in 2005. She played her first ITF Junior Circuit final at the Malta ITF Junior Tournament in 2006, losing to Cristina Sánchez Quintanar. Plíšková made her Grand Slam debut at the 2010 Australian Open and reached the semifinals. She defeated the first seed Tímea Babos in the quarterfinals, but then lost to Laura Robson. Robson was eventually beaten in the final by Plíšková's twin sister Karolína. At the 2010 French Open, Kristýna was defeated by Danka Kovinić in the first round. She then went on to win the Eastbourne International junior tournament, beating Tara Moore. Plíšková eventually won the Wimbledon girls' singles, defeating Sachie Ishizu.

Professional career

2006–2009
Plíšková played her first WTA Tour qualifying at the 2006 Prague Open, losing to Kirsten Flipkens. She proceeded with competing on the ITF Circuit.

In 2007, Plíšková was awarded a wildcard at the Prague Open but lost to the first seed Marion Bartoli. She also competed in the doubles event with her sister Karolína, but they lost to fellow Czechs Lucie Hradecká and Renata Voráčová in the first round.

In 2008, she won a wildcard for the Prague Open in both singles and doubles. In singles, Plíšková fell to Roberta Vinci in straight sets.

In 2009, she reached her first ITF singles final in Pesaro, but was defeated by Anastasia Grymalska.

2010
Plíšková won her first ITF title in May at Kurume, beating her sister in the final. At the Prague Open, she lost to the fifth seed Anabel Medina Garrigues in the first round. In doubles, she and her sister lost to Klaudia Jans and Alicja Rosolska in the opening round. She then played her first senior Grand Slam event at the US Open. She defeated Lauren Albanese and Arantxa Rus, but then lost to Lourdes Domínguez Lino in the final qualifying round.

2011
Plíšková was given a wildcard into the qualifying rounds of Wimbledon. She defeated all three of her opponents to qualify for her first career senior Grand Slam tournament.

2012

Plíšková qualified for the Wimbledon Championships and won her first Grand Slam main-draw match against Polona Hercog. However, in round two, she lost to 24th seed Francesca Schiavone, in straight sets. She then qualified for the US Open where she upset 18th seed Julia Görges in the first round; but again, failed to make it past the second round, losing to Mandy Minella.

2013
Plíšková began her season at the Brisbane International. She lost in the final round of qualifying to Australian wildcard Bojana Bobusic. At the Sydney International, Plíšková was defeated in the first round of qualifying by Andrea Hlaváčková. In Melbourne, Plíšková won her first-round match over Australian wildcard Sacha Jones. In the second round, she lost to 27th seed Sorana Cîrstea.

Playing in Paris at the WTA indoor event, Plíšková was defeated in the first round of qualifying by Lara Arruabarrena Vecino. Next, Plíšková played at a $25k tournament in Grenoble, France. She lost in the quarterfinals to Sandra Záhlavová. At the Dubai Championships, Plíšková was defeated in the first round of qualifying to Kurumi Nara. Seeded eighth at the Malaysian Open, she lost in the first round to qualifier Zarina Diyas. In Indian Wells, Plíšková was defeated in the first round of qualifying by American wildcard Grace Min. At the Miami Open, she lost in the final round of qualifying to Jana Čepelová. After that, Plíšková stayed in Florida to compete at the Oaks Club Challenger where she was beaten in her quarterfinal match by eventual finalist Estrella Cabeza Candela.

Plíšková began clay-court season at the Charleston Open. She lost in the final round of qualifying to Caroline Garcia. Playing at the first edition of the Katowice Open, she was defeated in the first round by third seed Klára Zakopalová. Seeded second at the first edition of the Lale Cup, Plíšková fell in her quarterfinal match to Ana Vrljić. Seeded fifth at the Slovak Open, she lost in the second round to Kateřina Siniaková.

2014
Plíšková won another two titles on the WTA Tour with her sister Karolína in doubles.

2015
She upset Svetlana Kuznetsova in Wimbledon to reach the third round of a Grand Slam championship for the first time in her career. However, she went on to lose to Monica Niculescu in the next round.

2016: First WTA Tour title
Plíšková defeated Samantha Stosur in the first round of the Australian Open, but lost to Monica Puig after setting a new WTA Tour record for the most aces (31) in a match, but failed to convert five match points. At the Tashkent Open, she went on to win her maiden WTA-level title defeating defending champion Nao Hibino.

2017: Second WTA final at home
Plíšková started the season at Shenzhen where she lost to Johanna Konta in three sets in the quarterfinals. In the Australian Open, she went on to lose to world No. 1 and defending champion, Angelique Kerber, in the third round.

She went on to defeat Roberta Vinci in the first round of Dubai Tennis Championships before losing to Lauren Davis in the second round in three sets.

In the Indian Wells Open, she reached the third round, where she faced Dominika Cibulková dominated the first set 6–2, before losing the last two sets in tiebreaks and having a match point at 5–4 in the deciding set. She lost her opener at the Miami Open to Mandy Minella, also in three sets. At the new WTA event Ladies Open Biel Bienne she reached the quarterfinals where she lost to her compatriot and later tournament champion Markéta Vondroušová in two sets. Plíšková then reached the final of the Prague Open, falling to Mona Barthel there. Plíšková won two matches in her other two WTA clay-court events but lost in the first round to Chloé Paquet at the French Open.

She had a decent grass-court season, amassing four wins in the Rosmalen Open, Mallorca Open, Eastbourne International and the Wimbledon Championships. Plíšková then proceeded to reach the final of an 80K event back home in Prague, but then cut her finger on an electric fan at the Jiangxi International Open, which resulted in her having to withdraw from her next two events. She returned to action in the Connecticut Open, losing to eventual champion Daria Gavrilova. At the US Open, she lost to Magdaléna Rybáriková in the second round.

2019
At the Birmingham Classic, she and her sister Karolína became the first identical twins in WTA Tour history to play each other in a main-draw match. Kristýna beat her sister, who was ranked over 100 places above her.

2021: First Grand Slam quarterfinal in doubles
Plíšková started her 2021 season at the first edition of the Yarra Valley Classic where she lost in the first round to Vera Zvonareva, in three sets. At the Australian Open, she was defeated in the first round by Heather Watson.

Getting past qualifying at the Qatar Ladies Open, Plíšková was eliminated in the first round by Anastasia Pavlyuchenkova. In Dubai, she was beaten in the first round by qualifier Tereza Martincová. At the Miami Open, she fell in the first round to Katie Boulter.

Plíšková began her clay-court season at the first edition of the Serbia Open. She lost in the first round to Océane Dodin. Competing in Strasbourg, she was defeated in the first round by Alizé Cornet. At the French Open, she was eliminated in the first round by eventual champion Barbora Krejčíková. In doubles, she partnered with her twin sister, Karolína. They reached the quarterfinals of a Grand Slam in doubles for the first time in their career. As a result, Kristýna reached a career-high ranking of 44 in doubles.

Performance timelines

Only main-draw results in WTA Tour, Grand Slam tournaments, Fed Cup/Billie Jean King Cup and Olympic Games are included in win–loss records.

Singles
Current through the 2021 Astana Open.

WTA career finals

Singles: 2 (1 title, 1 runner–up)

Doubles: 6 (5 titles, 1 runner–up)

WTA 125 tournament finals

Singles: 1 (1 title)

Doubles: 2 (2 titles)

ITF Circuit finals

Singles: 17 (9 titles, 8 runner–ups)

Doubles: 13 (8 titles, 5 runner–ups)

Junior Grand Slam finals

Girls' singles: 1 (title)

Head-to-head record

Wins over top 10 players
 She has a  record against players who were, at the time the match was played, ranked in the top 10.

Notes

References

External links

 
 
 
 Official website 

1992 births
Living people
People from Louny
Czech female tennis players
Twin sportspeople
Czech twins
Wimbledon junior champions
Grand Slam (tennis) champions in girls' singles
Sportspeople from the Ústí nad Labem Region